Ritu Kumar is an Indian fashion designer.

Early life and education
The lack of educational opportunities in Amritsar led her to move to Simla for her schooling, where she attended Loreto Convent. She later studied at Lady Irwin College, where she met and married Shashi Kumar, and then went on to accept a scholarship at Briarcliff College in New York, where she studied Art History. On returning to India, she studied museology at the Asutosh Museum of Indian Art, part of the University of Calcutta. Her son is Oscar nominated director, Ashvin Kumar.

Career

Kumar began her fashion business in Kolkata, using two small tables and hand-block printing techniques. Beginning with bridal wear and evening clothes in the 1960s and 70s, she eventually moved into the international market in the subsequent two decades. As well as shops in India, Kumar's company has also opened branches in Paris, London and New York. The London branch closed after three years, in 1999. Her company's annual turnover at the time was the highest of any Indian fashion outlet, estimated at around ₹10 billion. In 2002 she launched the "Label" line in partnership with her son Amrish.  Kumar discusses her career at length in a recent interview for the Creating Emerging Markets project at the Harvard Business School, beginning with how she first broke into the Paris and New York fashion houses and department stores in the 1970s.

Designs

Kumar's designs focus on natural fabrics and traditional printing and weaving techniques. She has also included Western elements in her work, but has generally not innovated beyond traditional sari designs. Her clothes have been worn by celebrities such as Princess Diana, Priyanka Chopra, Lara Dutta, Deepika Padukone, Madhuri Dixit Nene, Madhur Jaffrey, Kalki Koechlin, Dia Mirza, Soha Ali Khan and Jemima Goldsmith.

Website 
The domain ritukumar.com attracted 1,658,109 users in the year 2019. The company has also invested on server to handle excessive traffic during wedding seasons in India. The website of Ritu Kumar is designed by Digital Impressions.

Awards and recognition 
In 2013 Ritu Kumar was given the Padma Shri award by the Government of India.

She won the Achievement Award in 2012 at L’oreal Paris Femina Women’s Awards.

References

External links
 Official Website
 Ritu Kumar Label Official
 Ritu Kumar other Official Website

Indian women fashion designers
Living people
Recipients of the Padma Shri in other fields
Artists from Amritsar
21st-century Indian designers
Women artists from Punjab, India
Year of birth missing (living people)